Dana Vespoli is an American pornographic actress and film director.

Early life
Vespoli graduated from Mills College with a Bachelor of Arts degree in comparative literature.

Career
Vespoli began performing at age 31 as a stripper at the Mitchell Brothers O'Farrell Theatre in San Francisco, using the stage name "Christa". She entered the adult film industry in 2003, first as a performer, and then as a director and producer.

In April 2006, Vespoli began directing for Digital Sin. She has directed for Sweetheart Video and Evil Angel. She has received award nominations from AVN and Xbiz mostly for films she has directed for Evil Angel. Her directing work has focused mainly on lesbian scenes.

In 2011, Complex ranked her thirteenth on their list of "The Top 50 Hottest Asian Porn Stars of All Time". In 2014, Break.com ranked her 31st on their list of "40 Best Asian Porn Stars Today". Vespoli was inducted into the AVN Hall of Fame in 2016.

Personal life
Vespoli married pornographic actor Manuel Ferrara in January 2005 and has three children with him. The couple divorced seven years later.

References

Further reading

External links

 
 
 
 

American pornographic film actresses
American pornographic film directors
Living people
Mills College alumni
Women pornographic film directors
Year of birth missing (living people)
21st-century American women